This is a list of countries showing past fertility rate, ranging from 1950 to 2015 in five-year periods, as estimated by the 2017 revision of the World Population Prospects database by the United Nations Population Division. The fertility rate equals the expected number of children born per woman in her child-bearing years.

List of countries 1950 to 2015

List of regions

References

External links 

 United Nations, Department of Economic and Social Affairs – Population Division – World Population Prospects, the 2017 Revision

Fertility rate, past
Fertility rate, past
Human geography
Fertility